Dan Gelu Ignat (born 14 July 1986), commonly known as Dan Ignat, is a Romanian footballer who plays as a defender for Liga Dominicana club Atlético Pantoja.

Club career

Romania
He began his professional career in 2007 in his hometown, Drobeta-Turnu Severin. In the season207-2008 he played 20 games. Next season 2008-2009 he scored 2 goals in 26 games, one on 20 September 2008 in a 1–1 draw against CSM Râmnicu Vâlcea and another on 26 April 2009 in a 2–1 win over ASA 2013 Târgu Mureș.

In January 2010, he moved to Constanța where he signed a contract with SSC Farul Constanța.

In August 2010, he signed a contract with FC Viitorul Constanța. He made his debut for the club on 18 September 2010 in a 2–2 draw against CSM Ceahlăul Piatra Neamț  He also made an appearance in the 2010–11 Cupa României on 22 September 2010 in a 3–2 loss against CS Pandurii Târgu Jiu in the Round of 32.

He later moved to Brăila where he signed a six-month contract with ACS Dacia Unirea Brăila on 15 January 2011. He made his debut for the club on 5 March 2011 in a 3–1 loss against AFC Săgeata Năvodari and scored his first and only goal on 1 June 2011 in a 3–2 win over his former club, Farul Constanța.

Afterwards he transferred  to Slatina where he signed a short term contract with ACS Inter Olt Slatina on 1 August 2011. He made his debut for the club on 20 August 2011 in a 2–1 loss against FC Olt Scornicești.

In January 2012 he returned to Drobeta-Turnu Severin and signed a short term contract of 6 months with CS Turnu Severin

In July 2012 he returns to Brăila and signed a two-year contract with his former club, ACS Dacia Unirea Brăila. In the season 2013–14, he made his first appearance on 7 September 2013 2–2 draw against CS Municipal Unirea Slobozia.

Jordan
On 24 July 2014 he signed his first contract abroad with Al Ramtha club from Jordan playing 18 games in the championship scored 1 goal and playing another 6 games in the Jordan Cup.

Oman
In July 2015 he signs in Oman with Sohar Club for a period of 6 months.

Jordan
In January 2016 he returns to Jordan and signs with That Ras Club.

India
On 3 January 2017, he signed a six-month contract with I-League side Shillong Lajong FC. He made his I-League debut on 7 January 2017 in a 3–0 loss against defending champions and 2016 AFC Cup finalists, Bengaluru FC.

Jordan
In August 2017 he returns again to Jordan signing with Mansheyat Bani Hasan a contract for 1 year and plays 21 games.

Albania
In August 2018 he returns to Europe and signs with KF Vllaznia Shkodër in Albania.

Honours
Shillong Lajong
Shillong Premier League: 2016

References

External links

Dan Ignat – GOAL

1986 births
Living people
People from Drobeta-Turnu Severin
Romanian footballers
Romanian expatriate footballers
Association football defenders
AFC Dacia Unirea Brăila players
Liga II players
CSM Slatina footballers
Shillong Lajong FC players
I-League players
Expatriate footballers in Oman
Romanian expatriate sportspeople in Jordan
Expatriate footballers in Jordan
Romanian expatriate sportspeople in India
Expatriate footballers in India